Sheena Bora, an executive working for Mumbai Metro One (Reliance Infrastructure) based in Mumbai, went missing on 24 April 2012. In August 2015, Mumbai Police arrested her mother Indrani Mukerjea, her stepfather Peter Mukerjea, and her mother's driver, Shyamvar Pinturam Rai, for allegedly abducting and killing her and subsequently burning her corpse. Her step-father and Indrani's ex-husband Sanjeev Khanna and Rai confessed to the crime, and Mukerjea has said that Sheena Bora is living in the United States.

Early life, family history, and personal life
Sheena Das Bora and brother Mikhail were born to Pori Bora (later known as Indrani Mukerjea), an Indian HR consultant and media executive, and Siddhartha Das in 1987 in Shillong, Meghalaya. Indrani left the children under the care of her parents, Upendra Kumar Bora and Durga Rani in Guwahati and moved to Kolkata
. There she studied computers and stayed as a paying guest. Sheena and her brother were subsequently raised in the city of Guwahati by their maternal grandparents.

In Kolkata, Indrani married Sanjeev Khanna and the couple had a daughter Vidhie. They divorced in 2002, and Indrani later married Peter Mukerjea.

When Sheena learned about her mother and moved to Mumbai in 2006, Indrani introduced her as her younger sister. Sheena was admitted to St. Xavier's College where she obtained a Bachelor of Arts degree (2006-2009). In 2009, she joined Reliance Infrastructure as a management trainee. In June 2011, Sheena joined Mumbai Metro One as an assistant manager.

Disappearance
On 24 April 2012, Sheena took a leave of absence and "sent in her written resignation". On the same day, Rahul Mukerjea (Sheena's step-brother who she was dating) received a breakup SMS from Sheena's phone. Her mother, Indrani, said that Sheena had gone to the United States for higher studies and hence a missing First Information Report (FIR) was never filed. Sheena was never seen after 24 April 2012.

On Rahul's insistence, Mumbai Police visited Indrani's Worli residence where they were informed by the staff that Indrani was out of India. Upon her return, Indrani visited the Worli police station and informed the officers that Rahul was trying to stalk Sheena and that was why Sheena had moved to the US without informing him.

Discovery of death of and subsequent investigation
Four months before her arrest, Mumbai Police commenced surveillance of Indrani. The surveillance was initiated after a tip-off. Shyamvar Pinturam Rai, Indrani's driver, was arrested on 21 August 2015 for possession of illegal weapons and it was alleged that, during his interrogation, he revealed details of Sheena's murder. On 26 August 2015, Sheena's brother Mikhail revealed that she was Indrani's daughter rather than a sister.

Quoting the First Information Report filed by Mumbai Police, the Hindustan Times reported that Rai had given a detailed account of the murder to the police. Rai alleged that Indrani had planned it and had discussed it with her ex-husband, Sanjeev Khanna. He alleged that Indrani had surveyed a likely area to dump the body the evening before the murder. On 24 April 2012, Khanna had flown to Mumbai and checked into the Hotel Hilltop at Worli. Rai alleged that Indrani had rented an Opel Corsa to facilitate the abduction of Sheena and for disposal of her body. Indrani, he claimed, had earlier asked Sheena to meet her on the evening of 24 April 2012 and, though reluctant, she had agreed.  At about 06:00 PM on 24 April 2012, he went on, Indrani was joined by her ex-husband at his hotel in Worli. An hour later, when Sheena was dropped off by Rahul Mukerjea near National College on Linking Road in Bandra, Indrani, Khanna, and driver Rai were there to meet her. Rai's account continued, alleging that Indrani sat next to him while Sheena was in the rear seat with Khanna. He said they took her to one of the by-lanes in Bandra and Khanna strangled her.

The police claimed that, after the murder, Sheena's body was taken to Indrani's house at Worli where it was put in a bag and stuffed in the trunk of the car.

Rai alleged that Khanna later left for his hotel while Indrani stayed home and Rai slept inside the car with the body in the trunk. In the early hours of 25 April 2012, he said, the three accused drove to the village of Gagode in Pen tehsil, Raigad. Concerned about the possibility of police checks, they propped Sheena's body up between Indrani and Khanna on the rear seat, as if asleep, rather than putting it in the boot.

At 04:00 AM on 25 April 2012, police alleged, they dragged the body out of the car in an isolated spot in the forest, stuffed it back into the bag, poured petrol over it, and set it ablaze. After the body was completely burnt, the accused returned to Mumbai. Khanna left Mumbai later that day.

Arrest and aftermath
On 25 August 2015, Mumbai Police arrested Indrani Mukerjea accusing her of murdering Sheena. Indrani was charged under sections 302 (murder), 201 (disposing evidence or giving false statements), 363 (kidnapping) and 34 (common intention) of the Indian Penal Code and taken to the Bandra Metropolitan Magistrates' court, which remanded her in police custody. On 26 August 2015, Indrani's ex-husband Sanjeev was also arrested in Kolkata and charged under sections 364 (kidnapping), 302 (murder), 201 (causing disappearance of evidence) and 120-B (conspiracy) of the Indian Penal Code in the same case. Sanjeev allegedly confessed to the offences charged. Peter Mukerjea was arrested on 19 November 2015, on charges related to Sheena Bora's murder and was also accused of siphoning company funds into a bank account in Sheena Bora's name in Singapore.

In popular culture 
In 2016, Agnidev Chatterjee directed the movie Dark Chocolate to depict an "inspired" version of the "Sheena Bora murder case". The film starred Mahima Chaudhary and Riya Sen as Indrani Mukherjee and Sheena Bora, respectively.

References

2012 deaths
Indian murder victims
Mass media-related controversies in India
Trials in India
People murdered in Mumbai
Murder in India
Businesspeople from Guwahati
2012 murders in India
2012 murders in Asia